The United States Virgin Islands competed at the 1992 Winter Olympics in Albertville, France.

Competitors
The following is the list of number of competitors in the Games.

Alpine skiing

Men

Women

Bobsleigh

Luge

Men

Women

References

 Official Olympic Reports
 Olympic Winter Games 1992, full results by sports-reference.com

External links
 

Nations at the 1992 Winter Olympics
Winter Olympics
1992 Winter Olympics